Champaknagar is a small town some 30 km away from Agartala, the State capital of Tripur, India on the banks of river Saidra.

Education
 Champaknagar H.S School
 Tripura Loka Sikshalaya High School
 Montfort Higher Secondary School

Market
 Champaknagar Bazar

Hospital
 Champaknagar Primary Health Center

West Tripura district
Cities and towns in West Tripura district